The Angolan blue-tailed skink (Trachylepis laevis) is a species of skink found in Namibia and Angola.

References

Trachylepis
Reptiles described in 1907
Taxa named by George Albert Boulenger